The Eastern General Hospital was a health facility in Seafield Street in Leith, Edinburgh, Scotland. It was managed by NHS Lothian at its time of closure and prior to that was managed by Lothian Health Board.

History
The hospital was designed by Joseph Marr Johnston and was established in 1907 by Leith Parish Council as the Leith Poorhouse. Although it was built in two sections, a poorhouse section and a hospital section, the poorhouse section was almost immediately converted for medical use. It was requisitioned for military use during the First World War. An operating theatre and accommodation for nurses was added at this point. In 1931, plans were approved for conversion to a hospital. It joined the National Health Service in 1948 and developed considerable expertise in prosthetics before closing in 2007.

References

Hospitals in Edinburgh
Defunct hospitals in Scotland
Hospital buildings completed in 1907
Hospitals established in 1907